Siphopteron is a genus of sea slugs, marine gastropod molluscs in the family Gastropteridae.

Species
Species within the genus Siphopteron include:
 Siphopteron alboaurantium (Gosliner, 1984)
 Siphopteron brunneomarginatum (Carlson & Hoff, 1974)
 Siphopteron citrinum (Carlson & Hoff, 1974)
 Siphopteron flavobrunneum (Gosliner, 1984)
 Siphopteron flavum (Tokioka & Baba, 1964)
 Siphopteron fuscum (Baba & Tokioka, 1965)
 Siphopteron ladrones (Carlson & Hoff, 1974)
 Siphopteron leah Klussmann-Kolb & Klussmann, 2003
 Siphopteron michaeli (Gosliner & Williams, 1988)
 Siphopteron nigromarginatum Gosliner, 1989
 Siphopteron pohnpei (Hoff & Carlson, 1983)
 Siphopteron quadrispinosum Gosliner, 1989
 Siphopteron tigrinum Gosliner, 1989
 Siphopteron sp. 1

References

Gastropteridae